Alycia Kay Halladay is Chief Science Officer at the Autism Science Foundation. Until 2014, she served as the senior director of environmental and clinical sciences for Autism Speaks. She originally joined the National Alliance for Autism Research in 2005 before it merged with Autism Speaks, and was named the associate director of research for environmental sciences in 2007. She also serves at an adjunct professor in the Pharmacology and Toxicology Department at Rutgers University.

Education 

After obtaining her bachelor's degree from the University of Texas at Austin, Halladay received her M.S. (1998) and Ph.D. (2001) in psychology, both from Rutgers University, where she completed a postdoctoral fellowship in pharmacology and toxicology.

Autism 

At the Autism Science Foundation,  Halladay leads the science program of ASF, which includes pre and post doctoral fellowships, accelerator grants, as well as large scale projects including the Autism Sisters Project the outreach and communications behind the Autism BrainNet.  She also has experience managing consortium and multidisciplinary initiatives such as gene/environment interactions initiative, the High Risk Baby Siblings Consortium and the Toddler Treatment Network. She was interviewed by Parade magazine in 2013, saying,  "There are likely thousands of genes that contribute to risk. However, there are also some environmental factors that contribute to risk. These include maternal infection and certain chemical and medical exposures." She has also said that early intervention "can make a real lifetime of difference" with regard to improving symptoms of autism in children, and after a study on folic acid and autism was published in JAMA, Halladay said that taking folic acid during pregnancy was "a relatively inexpensive way that parents can take action to possibly prevent risk of tube birth defects and autism".

References 

Autism researchers
Living people
Rutgers University alumni
Year of birth missing (living people)
American psychiatrists
American women psychiatrists
21st-century American women